"Love Child" is a 1968 song released by the Motown label for Diana Ross & the Supremes. The second single and title track from their album Love Child, it became the Supremes' 11th (and penultimate) number-one single in the United States, where it sold 500,000 in its first week and 2 million copies by year's end.

The record took just three weeks to reach the Top Ten of the Billboard Hot 100 pop chart, which it then topped for two weeks, November 30—December 7, 1968, before being dethroned by an even bigger Motown single, Marvin Gaye's "I Heard It Through the Grapevine". "Love Child" also performed well on the soul chart — where it spent three weeks at number two (stuck behind Johnnie Taylor's "Who's Making Love") — and paved new ground for a major pop hit with its then-controversial subject matter of illegitimacy. It is also the single that finally knocked the Beatles' "Hey Jude" off the top spot in the United States after its nine-week run. The Supremes debuted the dynamic and intense song on the season premiere of the CBS variety program The Ed Sullivan Show on Sunday, September 29, 1968. In Billboards special 2015 chart of the Top 40 Biggest Girl Groups of All Time on the Billboard Hot 100, "Love Child" ranked highest among the Supremes' six entries.

History

Recording
In 1967, Diana Ross & the Supremes dropped Florence Ballard, engaged new member Cindy Birdsong and added Ross' name to the billing. Following this string of changes, the Supremes had mixed success on the pop charts. "Reflections" peaked at number 2 on the Billboard pop charts and "In and Out of Love" peaked at 9, but the group's next two singles did not make the pop top twenty.

This prompted Motown label chief Berry Gordy to hold a special meeting in a room at the Pontchartrain Hotel in Detroit, which was attended by a team of writers and producers at the label, including R. Dean Taylor, Frank Wilson, Pam Sawyer, Deke Richards, and Henry Cosby.  The group, who named themselves The Clan, set to work on a hit single for Diana Ross & the Supremes. Instead of composing another love-based song, the team decided to craft a tune about a woman who is asking her boyfriend not to pressure her into sleeping with him, for fear they would conceive a "love child." The woman, portrayed on the record by Diana Ross, is herself a love child, and, besides not having a father at home, had to endure wearing rags to school and growing up in an "old, cold, run-down tenement slum." The background vocals echo this sentiment, asking the boyfriend to please "wait/wait won't you wait now/hold on/wait/just a little bit longer."

As was nearly always the case on singles released under the "Diana Ross & the Supremes" name, Supremes members Mary Wilson and Cindy Birdsong do not perform on the record; Motown session singers The Andantes performed the background vocals.  All lead vocals were by Diana Ross, who would leave the group in a year for a solo career.

Reaction and response
The public responded immediately to "Love Child" when it was released as a single on September 30, 1968, rising to number one on the Billboard Hot 100 and becoming the third biggest selling Supremes' single behind "Baby Love" and "Someday We'll Be Together." The feat was repeated in Canada, where it also reached number one in the RPM 100 national singles chart. In the UK singles chart, the song peaked at number 15, and number three in Australia. "Love Child" became the title track of Diana Ross & the Supremes' Love Child album, released on November 13, 1968.

Cash Box said that "Diana Ross clicks with a contemporary narrative message which (accompanied by up-tempo beat and pop arrangements) open up a new top forty image for the act."

Track listing7" single (30 September 1968) (North America/United Kingdom)
"Love Child" – 2:59
"Will This Be the Day" – 2:507" single (1968)''' (Netherlands)
"Love Child" – 2:59
"Misery Makes Its Home in My Heart " – 2:52

Personnel
 Lead vocals by Diana Ross
 Background vocals by the Andantes: Jackie Hicks, Marlene Barrow, and Louvain Demps
 Instrumentation by the Funk Brothers and the Detroit Symphony Orchestra

Chart history

Weekly charts

Year-end charts

All-time charts

Certifications
 

Notable cover versions
 It was covered in 1990 by Sweet Sensation. Their cover peaked at number 13 in May 1990 on the Billboard Hot 100.

Use in popular culture
In 1992, World Industries released a skateboard video entitled Love Child. The soundtrack for the video consisted entirely of music from the late 1960s era (unusual for a skateboard video); the featured segment with Daewon Song was set to "Love Child" and after that, "One Bad Apple" by The Osmonds. To this day Love Child is considered one of the best skateboard videos ever made.

In 1996, a foreign version of the song known as "Halila", performed by the artist Laladin, was featured in the Demi Moore film Striptease.

In 2003, the song was featured prominently in The Wire episode "Backwash".

In 2010 Korean-born American professional skateboarder Daewon Song recreated the first part of his Love Child run trick-for-trick for a DVS Shoes promotional video.

In 2016, "Love Child" was featured on the in-game radio in Mafia III''.

See also
 List of Hot 100 number-one singles of 1968 (U.S.)
 Illegitimacy in fiction

Bibliography
 Chin, Brian and Nathan, David (2000). "Reflections Of..." The Supremes [CD Box Set]. New York: Motown Record Co./Universal Music.
 Posner, Gerald (2002). Motown : Music, Money, Sex, and Power. New York: Random House. .
 Wilson, Mary and Romanowski, Patricia (1986, 1990, 2000). Dreamgirl & Supreme Faith: My Life as a Supreme. New York: Cooper Square Publishers. .

References

External links 
 List of cover versions of "Love Child" at SecondHandSongs.com
 

1968 singles
The Supremes songs
Sweet Sensation songs
Billboard Hot 100 number-one singles
Cashbox number-one singles
RPM Top Singles number-one singles
Number-one singles in New Zealand
Songs written by Pam Sawyer
Songs written by R. Dean Taylor
Songs written by Frank Wilson (musician)
Songs written by Deke Richards
Motown singles
Psychedelic soul songs
Songs about parenthood
Songs about infidelity
1968 songs